Ghost work is work performed by a human, but believed by a customer to be performed by an automated process. The term was coined by anthropologist Mary L. Gray and computer scientist Siddharth Suri in their 2019 book, Ghost Work: How to Stop Silicon Valley from Building a New Global Underclass.

Definition 
Ghost work focuses on task-based and content-driven work that can be funneled through the Internet and application programming interfaces (APIs). This work can include labelling, editing, moderating, and sorting information or content.

Ghost work can be performed remotely and on a contractual basis. It is an invisible workforce, scaled for those who desire full-time, part-time, or ad-hoc work. Though it usually operates independent of location via the Internet, there are data factories in China that mine "the Saudi Arabia of data" by parsing, cataloguing, and assembling data useful to the nation's artificial intelligence (AI) ambitions. The core characteristics of ghost work are that it is low-wage, disposable, and menial. Ghost workers play a low-tech role in high-tech production, producing concerns that AI will make ghost work obsolete.

A benefit of ghost work is flexible hours because the worker chooses when they complete a task, making it an appealing option for those in between jobs or in need of side work. However, with the promise of flexible hours and endless tasks, companies can potentially undervalue, under-appreciate, or under-compensate workers. The modern workforce is beginning to adapt to this labor style, similar to Uber and Lyft drivers, as opposed to the standard nine-to-five workday.

In contrast to peer production which emphasizes the community spirit and co-work on open-source products, ghost work tends to be benefit-driven.

Ghost work is differentiated from gig work or temporary work because it is task-based and uncredited. While gig work involves a general platform, ghost work emphasizes the software or algorithm aspect of assisting machines to automate further. Through labelling content, ghost workers teach the machine to learn. Ghost workers at Amazon have found ways to help each other and self-organize, often through WhatsApp groups where they mobilize to push for changes to the platform.

Examples 
Amazon is the most notable instance of a company offering ghost work. The website requires a constant uploading of products, verification of product photos, the creation of product captions, and the updating of book reviews dating back to 2005. As a result, the Amazon Mechanical Turk website was created for "crowd workers" to claim and complete posted microwork tasks. The worker is paid after completing the tasks. Amazon also charged a small surcharge to match posters with those who had certain qualifications to complete the projects and tasks. This allowed almost anyone to use the site and find work. This platform allows for easy and inexpensive participation among workers, particularly young individuals.

Devaluation 
The concept of hiring on-demand workers is not new. By the late 1800s, Lowell mills paid farm families to hand-fashion cloth pieces into shirt flourishes that were still too delicate to churn out on the factory floor. Equivalently, today's companies hire on-demand workers to test the latest ranking, relevance, and crawling algorithms of their search engines so they can be perfected.

Contingent work was further devalued by culturally loaded notions surrounding what constitutes learned profession or "skillful" work, as well as which workers deserved or needed full-time jobs. Those involved in this type of labor could be written off, in part, because of their gender, skin color, nationality, professional training, physical location, or all of the above. Those doing on-demand jobs today are the latest iteration of the expendable ghost work. On the one hand, they are needed at the moment, yet undervalued as mundane and unsuccessful.

False perception 
The computer science world, including various tech companies, is invested in producing the image of technological magic. MTurk hides the people involved in the production, whose visibility could otherwise obstruct favorable perception. The following isn't only aimed at the public image of the company but also at investors, who are significantly more likely to back businesses built on scalable technology, not unwieldy workforces demanding office space and minimum wages. In addition, there exists a pervasive belief among engineers that these workers are a stopgap until AI can replace or do without them, which inevitably leads to their vital contributions being devalued. Despite the belief, the market for ghost work doesn't show apparent signs of declining. There are some disadvantages, but the ghost work industry will potentially grow even more in the upcoming years.

References 

Employment classifications
Precarious work